The Canton of Briec is a French canton, located in the arrondissement of Quimper, in the Finistère département (Brittany région). Since the French canton reorganisation which came into effect in March 2015, the communes of the canton of Briec are:

Briec (seat)
 Châteauneuf-du-Faou
 Le Cloître-Pleyben
 Coray 
 Edern
 Gouézec
 Landrévarzec
 Landudal
 Langolen
 Lannédern
 Laz
 Lennon
 Leuhan
 Lothey
 Pleyben
 Saint-Goazec
 Saint-Thois
 Trégourez

See also
Cantons of the Finistère department
List of cantons of France
Arrondissements of the Finistère department

References

Cantons of Finistère